Barry Edward Le Va (December 28, 1941 – January 24, 2021) was an American sculptor and installation artist. Trained in his native California, he lived and worked in New York City. Le Va was among the leading figures of post-studio and process art to have emerged in the late 1960s. His abstract sculptures, installations, drawings, and editioned works are featured in major art collections around the world.

Training and early career
Le Va attended California State University, Long Beach from 1960 to 1963, continuing his studies at Los Angeles College of Art & Design, and at the Otis Art Institute of LA County, Los Angeles, where he received a Master of Fine Arts (MFA) degree in 1967.

In 1968, Le Va was awarded a Young Talent Grant from the Los Angeles County Museum of Art. He worked as an instructor at Minneapolis College of Art & Design from 1968 to 1970, and taught advanced sculpture at Princeton University from 1973 to 1974. From 1976 he taught graduate-level classes in sculpture at Yale University,

In 1974, Le Va received a Guggenheim Fellowship for Sculpture, and in 1976, received a National Endowment for the Arts Fellowship.

Work 
Le Va's pioneering scatter pieces on the floor, started in 1966, made him one of the first of the so-called Process artists. In 1969, he started to create works with cleavers serially embedded in walls or floors. More recently, he produced monumental abstract works and site-specific installations.

Le Va's first solo exhibitions were held in 1969 at the Minneapolis Institute of Arts and at the Walker Art Center, Minneapolis. Since then, Le Va exhibited his work across the United States, as well as Canada, Europe, and Israel.

In 2005, Le Va's work was the subject of a major retrospective exhibition at the Institute of Contemporary Art, University of Pennsylvania, Philadelphia (ICA). The exhibition, Accumulated Vision, Barry Le Va, was accompanied by the publication of a comprehensive monograph of the artist's work. The ICA described Le Va's work as: "Since the late 1960s, the American artist Barry Le Va has used broken glass, meat cleavers, wool felt, ball bearings, powdered chalk, cast concrete, paper towels, linseed oil, a typewriter and a gun, among other things, to make his art. Part of a generation intent on knocking art off its pedestal, Le Va claimed the floor as his field of operations by scattering massive amounts of materials, or forms, to create works which he called "distributions." Apparently random, even chaotic, these installations are in fact premeditated and executed according to plan. Not surprisingly, drawing plays a significant role in the work of this artist whose formative training is in architecture. Le Va's distributions make him one of the leading practitioners of Post-minimalism and Process Art. But his own, preferred frame of reference comes not from recent art history, but from mystery novels. He has likened his installations to crime scenes and invites viewers to look for clues to reconstruct the, often violent, act or concept that underlies them."

Le Va was once described as being "Like his art, he's not such an easy guy to be around, by turns challenging, gracious, explanatory and gnomic".

The estate of Le Va is represented by David Nolan Gallery, who has been exhibiting shows with Le Va since 1989.  Le Va was previously represented by the Sonnabend Gallery in New York and Galerie Rolf Ricke in Cologne, Germany.  

Le Va's work is found in the following museum collections (among others):

 Albright-Knox Art Gallery, Buffalo, New York
 Art Institute of Chicago
 Dallas Museum of Art
 Los Angeles County Museum of Art
 Minneapolis Institute of Arts
 Museum of Contemporary Art, Los Angeles
 Museum of Modern Art, New York
 National Gallery of Art, Washington, D.C.
 Parrish Art Museum, Southampton, New York
 Serralves Museum of Contemporary Art, Porto, Portugal
 Staatliche Graphische Sammlung München
 Walker Art Center, Minneapolis
 Wexner Center for the Arts, Ohio State University, Columbus
 Whitney Museum of American Art, New York

Further reading
 Barry Le Va: The Aesthetic Aftermath by Michael Maizels, 2015, University of Minnesota Press

References

External links 
 MoMA | The Collection | Barry Le Va. (American, born 1941)
 Whitney Museum of American Art: Barry Le Va
 David Nolan Gallery | Barry Le Va

1941 births
2021 deaths
People from Long Beach, California
Modern artists
American installation artists
Sculptors from New York (state)
Sculptors from California
Art in Greater Los Angeles
20th-century American sculptors
20th-century American male artists
21st-century American sculptors
21st-century American male artists
California State University, Long Beach alumni
Otis College of Art and Design alumni
Minneapolis College of Art and Design faculty
Princeton University faculty
Yale University faculty
National Endowment for the Arts Fellows